The Ritz-Carlton Montreal is a luxury hotel located at 1228 Sherbrooke Street West, on the corner of Drummond Street, in Montreal, Quebec. Opened in 1912, it was the first Ritz-Carlton hotel in North America. Its name was originally licensed by César Ritz directly, and while the hotel is now part of the chain managed by the Ritz-Carlton Hotel Company, it retains its original branding stylization.

The original builders referred to themselves as the Carlton Hotel Company of Montreal, with the concept of naming the hotel after London's celebrated Carlton Hotel. However, one of the investors, Charles Hosmer, was a personal friend of César Ritz, and persuaded his colleagues to incorporate the Ritz name associated with the success of the Hôtel Ritz Paris, which opened in 1898.

For a fee of $25,000, César Ritz agreed to lend his name, but stipulated that by the "Ritz standards," every room was to have its bathroom, there was to be a kitchen on every floor so room-service meals could be served course by course, and around-the-clock valet and concierge service were to be made available to the guests for, amongst other duties, tracking lost luggage or ordering theatre tickets. Finally, the lobby was to be small and intimate, with a curved grand staircase, for ladies to show off their ball gowns on their descent.

Early years
Montreal has developed a positive reputation for its top hotels since around 1820, when John Bigsby observed that the city's hotels were "as remarkable for their palatial exteriors as they are for their excellent accommodation within." Donegana's Hotel became the largest in the British Colonies in the 1840s, and the Windsor had been Montreal's pre-eminent hotel in the 1870s.

By 1909, some of the city's wealthiest citizens wanted a modern "first class residential hotel". The citizens, led by Charles Hosmer (a personal friend of César Ritz), Sir Herbert Holt, Sir Montagu Allan, and Sir Charles Gordon, met with the Hon. Lionel Guest (a first cousin of Winston Churchill) and Harry Higgins (Chairman of the Ritz Hotel London) to found the Carlton Hotel Company of Montreal. The land on which the hotel was built was purchased from Charles Meredith, who became the fifth principal shareholder, and had a significant influence on the hotel's image and future. The hotel was designed by the architectural firm of Warren and Wetmore, and it was completed at a cost of $2 million. Its doors officially opened at 11:15 pm on New Year's Eve, 1912, marked by a gala ball attended by 350 guests.

As the founders had hoped, two-thirds of the guests at the Ritz-Carlton took suites comprising several rooms and lived there permanently for $29 a month. The First World War made standards difficult to keep, and in 1922, in direct rivalry to the Ritz-Carlton, the Mount Royal Hotel, was erected as the largest hotel in the British Empire.  The Ritz-Carlton and the Mount Royal Club (not to be confused with the similarly named hotel) were the most fashionable meeting places for the city's wealthy within the area later known as the Golden Square Mile.  On Valentine's Day, 1916, the first transcontinental telephone call was made from the hotel. An audience of two hundred businessmen were said to have listened breathlessly as the Chairman of the Bell Telephone Company enquired: "Hello. Is this Vancouver?" The clear reply - "Yes" - was met with a roar of approval and toasted with champagne.

In the years before the Wall Street Crash of 1929, the hotel enjoyed a period of great prosperity. In 1918, Lord Birkenhead described it as "very luxurious and comfortable," and the American Bankers Association held their annual meetings there. In 1919, the Prince of Wales made the first Royal visit, staying in the seventeen-room Royal Suite. Queen Marie of Romania, Prince Felix of Luxembourg and Prince George, Duke of Kent also stayed at the hotel in the 1920s. Several movie idols stayed, such as Lillie Langtry, Mary Pickford, and Douglas Fairbanks. Former US President William Howard Taft and his wife "entertained lavishly" in the Presidential Suite for all of 1921.

Depression
The Wall Street Crash of 1929 was followed by the Great Depression and then World War II. The Swiss General Manager, Émile Charles des Baillets, had been with the hotel since 1924. In 1929, he lamented that before guests had come to stay for several weeks accompanied by trains of luggage, but during this time, when they did come, they came for a night or two with only a single bag.

Many of its in-house residents were not as badly affected as their American counterparts following 1929, and they stayed loyal to the hotel through its dark days. From the 1930s, when the widows and residents of the Golden Square Mile began to downsize from their mansions, a great many took rooms in the hotel, such as Lady Shaughnessy and founder Charles Hosmer's son, Elwood, who between him and sister had inherited $20 million from their father in 1927. The hotel's international reputation remained untarnished with guests such as Winston Churchill, Charles de Gaulle, Marlene Dietrich, Liberace, Tyrone Power and Maurice Chevalier. However, as the last of the loyal Square Milers (who had been so pivotal to its early success) were dying off, the hotel began to fall into debt.

Wartime shortages made it difficult to maintain the graceful living standards set by the original founders. The General Manager, des Baillets, was succeeded by Albert Frossard in 1940, another native of Switzerland. Unhappily, and not without a fight, Frossard had to bow to the directors' commands to relax the custom of formal dress, of either White tie or Black tie, to suits in order to allow more people to dine at the hotel. Nonetheless, the change proved successful and the hotel realized larger profits.

Post-war
In 1947, the hotel was sold to François Dupré, who formed a new board of directors and named himself president. Already the owner of two prestigious hotels in Paris - Hotel George V, Paris and the Plaza Athénée, Dupré had money, talent and experience, and brought with him some of the flair of César Ritz. He opened le Bar Maritime in 1948 and in the early 1950s added the Ritz Garden, where patrons could dine around a flower-fringed pond, which was home to twenty-four ducklings.

In 1957, a new wing consisting of sixty-seven rooms and suites was added, and care was taken to maintain the original Ritz-influenced Louis XVI and Carlton-influenced Regency styles and ambience. When the renovation was complete, Howard Hughes was the first person to check in, booking out over half of the eighth floor. Between 1959 and 1969, the image of the hotel was more like that of a Gentlemen's club. It catered to Montreal's old money and kept a low-key, understated profile. However, publicity it could not escape was the wedding of Elizabeth Taylor to Richard Burton that took place in the Royal Suite in 1964.

Modern times
By 1970, it was felt an overhaul of the hotel was long overdue. Shedding its formal image, it was updated to a site of historical importance, combined with modern styles, luxury and services. In 1971, Richard Nixon stayed there, and in 1972, The Rolling Stones booked out the entire sixth floor, but were refused service in the main dining room for not being suitably attired; they later returned in jackets. In 1976, the hotel received two famous guests ,Queen Elizabeth II and Prince Philip, as well as the most renowned award for a hotel: the AAA Five Diamond distinction. In 1977, champagne corks were popped at the Oval Room party, at which 600 guests bade farewell to esteemed General Manager Fred Laubi while welcoming his successor. At the age of 36, Fernand Roberge was appointed the first French-Canadian general manager of the hotel. Under his command, terrycloth bathrobes, French toiletries, bathroom scales, and large umbrellas were placed in every room.  By 1979, the lobby and reception areas were enlarged and 100 rooms and suites had been redecorated. In 1984, Brian Mulroney was using the hotel like a second home, and Pierre Elliott Trudeau became a regular after having taken up residence at his nearby art deco mansion, Maison Cormier, in the same year. In 1988, the year of its 75th Anniversary, the Ritz-Carlton Montreal welcomed the Queen Mother. The same year, in order to celebrate the Dames and Messieurs of the Ritz-Carlton, all the employees and their spouses were invited to dine at the Café de Paris. Other leading figures of the 20th century that stayed at the Ritz-Carlton Montreal, include Charles de Gaulle, George H. W. Bush, and Céline Dion. Israeli Prime Minister Benjamin Netanyahu took refuge there during the 2002 Concordia University Netanyahu riot.

The Ritz-Carlton Montreal closed in 2008 for renovation and reopened after a $200 million restoration.

Today, the hotel is part of The Ritz-Carlton Hotel Company, LLC., owned by Marriott International. Unlike other Ritz-Carlton hotels, the hotel is still using its iconic lion emblem.

The Ritz-Carlton makes a feature in the 1996 film, "Matilda".

Rooms and suites
The hotel has 96 rooms and 33 suites, including the Royal Suite, which consists of 4,700 square feet and 3 bedrooms.  When the hotel completed its renovations in 2012, the Royal Suite was the largest hotel room in Canada, renting for $7,000 to $10,000 per night.

Restaurants
Since 2012, the hotel's main restaurant is Maison Boulud, named for the celebrity chef Daniel Boulud. The hotel also offers afternoon tea in the refurbished Palm Court.

Pool and spa
The rooftop is equipped with a saltwater infinity pool.

In 2015, the hotel added a spa for the first time, as the Spa St. James moved into the hotel from its prior location in a historic building on Crescent Street.

Awards and accolades

 Travel and Leisure Awards 2021: #1 Best City Hotel in Canada
 2021 U.S. News & World Report: #2 Best Hotel in Canada
 Forbes Travel Guide: 2019 Best Rooms
 Traveler's Choice Awards 2019 : #1 Best Hotel in Canada
 2019 U.S. News & World Report: #4 Best Hotel in Canada
 Conde Nast Traveler 2018: Best hotel to stay in Montreal
 Travel and Leisure Awards 2018: #2 Best City Hotel in Canada
 Traveler's Choice Awards 2018 : #19 Best Luxury Hotel in the World and #1 Best Hotel in Canada
 2018 CAA/AAA Five Diamond Award®
 2017 CAA/AAA Five Diamond Award®
 World Travel Awards: Canada's Leading Hotel Suite 2017: Royal Suite
 U.S. News & World Report, “Best Hotels in Canada 2017,” January 2017 – named the Best Hotel in Canada
 TripAdvisor 2016 Traveler’s Choice Award, January 2016 – named the Top Luxury Hotel in Canada
 U.S. News & World Report, “Best Hotels in Canada 2016,” January 2016 – named the Best Hotel in Canada
 Condé Nast Traveler 2016 Gold List, “Our Favourite Hotels in the World,” December 2015
 Condé Nast Traveler Readers Choice Awards, “Best Hotels in Canada 2015,” October 2015 – named one of the best hotels in Canada
 Travel + Leisure, “2015 World’s Best Award,” July 2015 – named top city hotel in Canada
 Forbes Travel Guide Four-Star Hotels, February 2015
 Forbes Travel Guide Four-Star Restaurants, February 2015 – awarded to Maison Boulud, one of only two restaurants to be recognized in Montreal
 2015 AAA Five Diamond Award®, January 2015 – the only hotel in Quebec to receive the Five Diamond Rating and one of just six in Canada
 U.S. News & World Report, “Best Hotels in Canada 2015,” January 2015 – named the Best Hotel in Canada
 Travel + Leisure, “World’s Best Hotels for Families,” November 2014 – named one of the best in Canada
 Travel + Leisure, “2014 World’s Best Awards,” August 2014 – named one of the top City Hotels in Canada
 U.S. News & World Report, “Best Hotels in Canada 2014,” January 2014 – named the Best Hotel in Canada
 2014 AAA Five Diamond Award®, January 2014 – the only hotel in Quebec to receive the Five Diamond Rating and one of just five in Canada
 Condé Nast Traveler 2014 Gold List, “The World’s Best Hotels,” January 2014 – recognized as the highest scoring hotel in Quebec with an overall score of 92.7
 2013 Fodor’s 100 Hotel Award, “Enduring Classics” winner, October 2013 – one of just three in Canada to make the list
 U.S. News & World Report, “Best Luxury Hotels in Canada,” July 2013
 Robb Report’s “Top 100 Hotels in the World,” May 2013
 Condé Nast Traveler 2013 Hot List, “Best New Hotels in the World” winner, April 2013
 2013 AAA Five Diamond Award®, October 2012 – the only hotel in Quebec to receive the Five Diamond Rating and one of just four in Canada

References

External links

 
 Biography of François Dupré
Photograph:Ritz Carleton Hotel, 1915 - McCord Museum
Photograph:Ritz Carleton Hotel, 1924 - McCord Museum
Photograph:Ritz Carleton Hotel, about 1938 - McCord Museum

Hotels in Montreal
Montreal
Warren and Wetmore buildings
Downtown Montreal
Condo hotels in Canada
Hotel buildings completed in 1912
Hotels established in 1912